Achuvinte Amma is a 2005 Indian Malayalam-language drama film directed by Sathyan Anthikad and written by Ranjan Pramod from a story by Rajesh Jayaraman. It stars Urvashi, Meera Jasmine and Narain. The music is composed by Ilaiyaraaja. It was also a comeback movie for Urvashi in Malayalam after a gap of six years. The film has won several awards, including the National Film Award for Best Supporting Actress (Urvashi), Filmfare Award for Best Film - Malayalam, and Filmfare Award for Best Actress - Malayalam for Meera Jasmine.

Plot 
Vanaja is a single mother who lives with her daughter Ashwathy (Achu) and works as an insurance agent at LIC. Achu and her mother have a close relationship and never keep secrets from each other. One day, they meet Emmanuel John, known as Ijo who is an advocate, at a railway station in Trivandrum, where Achu has a job interview at a private firm. After this first meeting, Achu and Ijo run into each other periodically, developing a friendship, and eventually, a budding romance. Achu gets a job with a construction company and she and her mother's standard of living improves. She expresses her wish to marry Ijo to Vanaja. Vanaja wishes to meet Ijo's parents to learn more about him. Ijo takes them to a cemetery revealing that he is an orphan and his family had committed mass suicide due to a financial crisis, leaving him as the sole survivor. Vanaja suddenly changes her mind and opposes the marriage, saying she wants her daughter to get married into a big family where there would be many people who would care and help them when they were in need.

Vanaja's opposition shocks and infuriates Achu and she confronts Vanaja with questions about her father, leading to an argument. Vanaja refuses to reveal anything and Achu storms out. She ultimately decides to stay with Ijo, though he advised her to return home. Achu is adamant and remains with her friend. Meanwhile, Ijo tries to mend the relationship between Achu and her mother, but Achu doesn't listen to him.

Meanwhile, due to unforeseen circumstances, Achu has to leave her friend's place. Realizing that she has no place to stay, Achu loses hope and is involved in a road accident. Vanaja rushes to see her in hospital but Achu still refuses to talk to her mother. Vanaja opens up to Ijo and tells him about her past. An old woman raised Vanaja, and after her death, Vanaja did odd jobs and worked as a laborer along with other adolescent girls. One day, all the girls Vanaja was working with were going to be transported for Flesh Trade. Vanaja, upon finding this out decided to run away instead and in the process came across a young girl with whom she escaped. Vanaja adopts the girl and names her Achu.

Vanaja tells Ijo that he should marry Achu as soon as possible, while Ijo promises to take good care of her. Ijo reveals the whole story to Achu. A few days later, Achu returns to Vanaja suffering from the utmost guilt and regret. Finally, they happily reconcile.

Cast 

 Urvashi as K.P. Vanaja, an LIC agent
 Meera Jasmine as Aswathy / Achu
 Narain as Advocate Immanuel John / Ijo (voice dubbed by Sarath Das, credited as Sunil Kumar)
 Innocent as Paulose
 K. P. A. C. Lalitha as Kunjala Chedathi
 Sukumari as Moothamma
 Oduvil Unnikrishnan as Abdullah
 P. Sreekumar as ASI Madhusoodhanan Pillai
 Vettukili Prakash as Kunjoy
 Anoop Chandran as Ijo's friend
 Pala Aravindan as Hospital Staff
 Valsala Menon as Kathreena
 Reshmi Boban as Usha		
 Mahima as Ramla
 Anitha Nair as Smiley (Achu's neighbor & a serial actress)  
 Manikandan Pattambi
 Vinod Kovoor as an employee in Paulose shop 
 Lakshana (actress) as Rukhiya
 Nivedita
 Vijayan Peringode
 Ranjan Pramod as Co-traveller in bus (cameo)
 Suraj Venjaramoodu as Bus conductor
 Althara as young Vanaja
 Ambika Rao as Vanaja's Neighbour 
 Dinesh Prabhakar as staff in bus

Reception

Critical 

Reviewing the film for Now Running, Hari Krishnan gave the film 3 stars out of 5 and wrote, "Achuvintte Amma is a relevant subject that both scriptwriter and director dealt with very efficiently. Satyan Anthikkad reiterates that good films can win the heart of public and he is still with family oriented subject, which has a moral value in the society." He also praised the performance of the lead cast writing, "Urvashi registers a brilliant comeback. Meera Jasmine excels with her natural performance and Sunil Kumar an upcoming star has long way to go. Actors like K. P. A. C Lalitha, Innocent, Sukumari and Oduvil Unnikrishnan supported the main actors very well." Oneindia gave the film 4 out of 5 stars and a Hit mark. Sify gave an "Above Average" verdict and wrote, "Satyan has succeeded in bringing out the bond between a young mother and her 20-year-old daughter effectively in the first half and laced it with some hilarious moments. But post interval, the story loses its track and the script goes haywire." They further added, "Though Achuvinte Amma has some flaws in its story telling method, that mars the tempo, the film is recommended for the sake of the one woman dynamo called Urvashi."

The reviewer for Web India called the film "well scripted" and praised the performance of the lead cast, especially Urvashi, writing, "Urvashi proves yet again that she can handle any role with ease. After a break, she has come back to films in top form. Meera Jasmine looks cute and does her role well. Sunil Kumar, who has acted in 4 the People before, shows promise." Concluding, they wrote, "Overall the film is worth watching." In 2019, Neelima Menon of The News Minute criticizes the climax writing, "Urvashi’s single mother not only has a bizarre backstory about rescuing the child and adopting her, we are also shown society’s myopic reactions to her single status." Apunkachioce described Achuvinte Amma as an "eminently watchable film". Mouthshut also gave a similar comment quoting "[t]his film has witnessed a great comeback by the Malayalam film industry, and I hope the trend continues, and more and more such good films are produced which will put all others to shame". BizHat wrote, "Urvashi as Vanaja proves that she is a wonderful actress. Her performance in the climax is heartrending. Meera Jasmine as Achu too does a good job. Sunil as Jijo surprises you with his performance."

Theatrical 
The film was commercially successful. BizHat called the film "a sleeper hit". It completed 200 days in noon show in Thiruvananthapuram and Kozhikode, at the state government run Kairali theatre. On 24 March 2006, Sreedhar Pillai of The Hindu wrote, "A film that ran for 200 days. It was a big hit, especially with women who thronged the theatres to watch her (Urvashi) play foster mother to Meera Jasmine." According to a trade analysis by Sify, Achuvinte Amma performed well in bigger cities than smaller ones. It managed to get a share of around ₹7 lakhs from Kairali theatre, Thiruvananthapuram in 40 days, while it only got distributors share of ₹1.1 lakhs in Kottayam. It was the only film of the year that was successful without featuring any major stars.

Awards
National Film Awards
2006: Best Supporting Actress - Urvashi

Filmfare Awards South
 Filmfare Award for Best Film - P. V. Gangadharan
 Filmfare Award for Best Actress - Malayalam - Meera Jasmine
 Filmfare Award for Best Music Director - Malayalam - Ilaiyaraaja

Asianet Film Awards
 Asianet Film Awards for Best Film - P. V. Gangadharan
 Asianet Film Awards for Best Actress - Meera Jasmine
 Asianet Film Awards for Best Female Playback Singer - K.S.Chitra

Kerala State Film Awards
 Kerala State Film Award for Best Film with Popular Appeal and Aesthetic Value- P. V. Gangadharan, Sathyan Anthikkad
 Kerala State Film Award for Best Dubbing Artist - Sarath Das

Soundtrack

The film features songs composed by Ilaiyaraaja and written by Gireesh Puthenchery.

References

External links
 
 https://web.archive.org/web/20101204072718/http://popcorn.oneindia.in/title/1973/achuvinte-amma.html

2000s Malayalam-language films
2005 films
Indian drama films
Films shot in Kozhikode
Films directed by Sathyan Anthikad
Films featuring a Best Supporting Actress National Film Award-winning performance
Films scored by Ilaiyaraaja